Mangué Camara (born 15 September 1982 in Macenta) is a Guinean football player who plays for AS Moulins.

He was part of the Guinean 2004 African Nations Cup team, who finished second in their group in the first round of competition, before losing in the quarter finals to Mali.

Camara helped AS Moulins reach the quarter-finals of the 2013–14 Coupe de France, but missed out on the historic match through a foot injury sustained in the previous round.

References

External links
 

1982 births
Living people
Guinean footballers
Guinea international footballers
Guinean expatriate footballers
Expatriate footballers in France
FC Rouen players
AS Kaloum Star players
AS Moulins players
2004 African Cup of Nations players
Association football midfielders